My Little Pony: Friendship Is Magic is animated children's television series created by Lauren Faust and based on the fourth incarnation of Hasbro's My Little Pony toyline and media franchise. The show follows a studious anthropomorphic unicorn (later an alicorn) pony named Twilight Sparkle (Tara Strong) and her friends Applejack (Ashleigh Ball), Rarity (Tabitha St. Germain), Fluttershy (Andrea Libman), Rainbow Dash (Ball), and Pinkie Pie (Libman), and dragon assistant, Spike (Cathy Weseluck), who travel on adventures and help others around Equestria while working out problems that arise in their own friendships.

Numerous home video releases have been distributed. Shout! Factory has the DVD publishing rights for the series within Region 1. 23 five-episode DVDs and three six-episode DVDs have been released to date. The first seven seasons of the series have been released in complete DVD box sets. United Kingdom-based Clear Vision has the publishing rights for the first two seasons throughout Region 2, including most of Western Europe and the Middle East; however, the company abruptly entered administration in December 2013. Madman Entertainment has the license for publishing the series via DVDs and digital downloads in Region 4.

Region 1 (DVD)

Region 2 (DVD)

Region 4 (DVD)

Worldwide (Blu-ray)

References

External links
My Little Pony at Shout! Factory

My Little Pony: Friendship Is Magic
My Little Pony: Friendship Is Magic